John Plessington (c. 1637 – 19 July 1679), also known as John Plesington, William Scarisbrick and William Pleasington, was an English Catholic priest who was executed by the English Crown for violating the ban on the presence of Catholic priests in the kingdom. He is now honored as one of the Roman Catholic Forty Martyrs of England and Wales.

Life
He was born at Dimples Hall, Garstang, Lancashire, the son of Robert Plessington, a Royalist Roman Catholic, and Alice Rawstone, a family thus persecuted for both their religious and political beliefs. He was educated by the Jesuits at Scarisbrick Hall, then at the Royal College of Saint Alban at Valladolid, Spain, and then at Saint Omer Seminary in France. He was ordained in Segovia, Spain, on 25 March 1662. He returned to England in 1663 ministering to covert Catholics in the areas of Holywell and Cheshire, often hiding under the name John Scarisbrick. He was also tutor at Puddington Old Hall near Chester. Upon arrest in Chester during the Popish Plot scare caused by Titus Oates, he was imprisoned for two months, and then hanged, drawn and quartered for the crime of being a Catholic priest. From the scaffold at Gallow's Hill in Boughton, Cheshire, he spoke the following:

 
Plessington was beatified in 1929 by Pope Pius XI, and canonized and made one of the Forty Martyrs on 25 October 1970 by Pope Paul VI.

Memorial
There is a memorial tablet to him located in the entrance porch of St Werburgh's Catholic Church, Grosvenor Park Road, Chester, just a short distance from where he was executed. In 1980 his name was added to the base of the granite obelisk nearby that was erected in 1898 for the Protestant martyr George Marsh in Boughton, which has the following inscription:

There is now a Catholic school called St. John Plessington in Wirral, England which won TES School of the Year 2010 out of England, Wales, Ireland and Scotland.

Remains
In the early 21st century, a set of human bones found in an old trunk in Wales came to be regarded as possibly being Plessington's remains. They had been found in the late 19th century, wrapped in 17th-century clothing, in a pub in Holywell, Flintshire, which had been known to be a secret gathering place for the Catholics of the region to worship covertly. This had been the region where he had carried out his ministry before his arrest. Showing signs of violence, the bones had been considered those of some anonymous martyrs of the period and entrusted to a community of the  Society of Jesus in nearby Tremeirchion.

When a grave believed to have been Plessington's was opened in 1962 as part of the process for his beatification, it was found to contain the remains of a younger man. Interest later focused on this set of remains. In 2015, Mark Davies, Roman Catholic Bishop of Shrewsbury, started a campaign to raise the funds for the testing of the DNA of the bones.

References

External links
Catholic Forum
A brief history of Boughton

1630s births
1679 deaths
People from Garstang
17th-century English Roman Catholic priests
Executed people from Lancashire
17th-century Christian saints
17th-century Roman Catholic martyrs
Martyred Roman Catholic priests
People executed by Stuart England by hanging, drawing and quartering
Forty Martyrs of England and Wales
English Roman Catholic saints